Covert is a surname. Notable people with the surname include:

 Allen Covert (born 1964), American comedian
 Eugene E. Covert, American scientist
 Frank Manning Covert (1908–1987), Canadian lawyer
 James W. Covert (1842–1910), American politician
 Jim Covert (born 1960), former American football player
 John Covert (painter) (1882–1960), American painter
 John S. Covert (died 1881), Canadian ship builder and politician
 Ralph Covert, American singer
 Scott Covert, American artist